Elsa George, better known by her stage names Muktha and Bhanu is an Indian actress who works in Malayalam and Tamil film industries and television actress.  She is also a classical dancer and an entrepreneur.

Early life
Originally from Angamaly, Muktha was born as Elsa George, the youngest of two children to George and Saly at Kolenchery. She has an elder sister, Doshy Marya George. She went to St. Augustine's Girls Higher Secondary School, Kothamangalam, Kerala.

Career
Muktha started her career as a child artist when she was in class six. She acted in television serials such as Swaram (on Amrita TV)  and then switched to the film industry..She started her carrier by playing supporting role in Otta Nanayam, released in 2005.But her first film in main role was Lal Jose's Achanurangatha Veedu, released in 2005, when Muktha was doing her 8th standard. She was seen as Lisamma in the film and The Hindu wrote "It's perhaps one of the most enduring female roles in modern Malayalam cinema".

She later acted in a Telugu film titled Photo opposite Anand and Anjali. She made her successful entry into the Tamil film industry with the film Thaamirabharani opposite Vishal. She later starred in some Malayalam films like Nasrani and Goal.

She played an established actress in the Tamil film Pudhumugangal Thevai. In Moondru Per Moondru Kadhal she played the role of a "feisty young woman" called Mallika who belongs to a fishing community. For her role, she spent one month on the beach under the sun, getting herself a tan and also learnt to speak Tamil in the Nagercoil slang. In 2013, she signed her first Kannada film, Darling, directed by Santhu where she starred opposite Yogi.

Personal life
On 23 August 2015, she got engaged to Rinku Tomy, brother of Rimi Tomy. On 30 August 2015, they married at St. George Catholic Forane Church in Edappally. They have a daughter, Kanmani, born in 2016. Muktha is a trained classical dancer and has done many stage shows. She is also managing a beauty salon.

Filmography

Television

References

External links
 

Living people
Actresses from Kochi
Actresses in Tamil cinema
Actresses in Malayalam cinema
Actresses in Kannada cinema
Indian film actresses
21st-century Indian actresses
1991 births
Indian television actresses
Actresses in Malayalam television
Actresses in Telugu cinema
Actresses in Tamil television